Hot Country Songs is a chart that ranks the top-performing country music songs in the United States, published by Billboard magazine.  In 1990, 24 different songs topped the chart in 52 issues of the magazine.  The chart was published under the title Hot Country Singles through the February 10 issue and Hot Country Singles & Tracks thereafter.  With effect from the January 20 issue, Billboard discontinued its longstanding methodology of compiling the chart based on playlists submitted by country music radio stations and sales reports submitted by stores and instead began basing the chart on weekly airplay data from radio stations compiled by Nielsen Broadcast Data Systems.

At the start of the year, the number one song on the chart was Highway 101's "Who's Lonely Now", which had been at the top of the chart since the issue of Billboard dated December 30, 1989.  It remained in the top spot for one further week in 1990 before being replaced by "It Ain't Nothin'"  by Keith Whitley.  This was the second of two posthumous number ones for Whitley, who had died in May of the previous year.  Three months later, Whitley's widow Lorrie Morgan topped the chart for the first time with "Five Minutes".  Other artists who topped the chart for the first time in 1990 were Travis Tritt, who spent one week at number one with "Help Me Hold On", and Joe Diffie, who reached number one with his debut single "Home".

The change in the chart's methodology led to an increase in the length of time songs spent in the top spot; in 1990, thirteen songs spent more than one week at number compared with just two in the previous year.   When Randy Travis spent four weeks at the top of the chart in March and April with "Hard Rock Bottom of Your Heart", it was the first time that a song had spent as long in the top spot since "Mammas Don't Let Your Babies Grow Up to Be Cowboys" by Waylon Jennings and Willie Nelson in 1978.  George Strait's "Love Without End, Amen", which topped the chart for five weeks in June and July, was the nineteenth number-one country song of his career but the first to spend more than one week at the top.  The five weeks spent at the top by the song was the longest run at number one by a song.  Strait also spent four weeks at number one with "I've Come to Expect It from You" to give him a total of nine weeks at the top of the chart in 1990, the most by any artist.  Clint Black, Dan Seals, Garth Brooks and Alabama were the only other acts to place two songs at number one during the year.  Strait's "I've Come to Expect It from You" was the final number one of the year.

Chart history

See also
1990 in music
List of artists who reached number one on the U.S. country chart

References

1990
1990 record charts
Country